Caatiba is a municipality in the state of Bahia, Brazil. In 2020 it had 6,488 inhabitants. Until 1961 it belonged to the municipality of Vitória da Conquista when it became independent. In 1962 the first election took place and the mayor elected, Iris Geraldo Silveira, started his term in 1963.

Mayors
 1963–1966 – Iris Geraldo Silveira
 1967–1970 – Jacson Pereira Rangel
 1971–1972 – José Nilton Rocha Lobo
 1973–1976 – Jacson Pereira Rangel
 1977–1982 – Florival da Costa Barreto
 1983–1988 – Luíz Miranda de Oliveira
 1989–1992 – Jailton Matos dos Santos
 1993–1996 – Luíz Miranda de Oliveira
 1997–2000 – Humberto de Almeida Antunes
 2001–2004 – Ernevaldo Mendes de Sousa
 2005–2007 – Ernevaldo Mendes de Sousa
 2007–2007 – Omar Sousa Barbosa (October 19, 2007 to October 30, 2007)
 2007–2008 – Ernevaldo Mendes de Sousa
 2009–2012 – Omar Sousa Barbosa
 2013–2016 – Joaquim Mendes de Sousa Júnior (January 1, 2013 to August 22, 2016)
 2016–2016 – Nailson Batista Silva (August 25, 2016 to December 31, 2016) 
 2017–2017 – Luís Paulo Souza Paiva (January 1, 2017 to June 6, 2017)
 2017–2020 – Maria Tânia Ribeiro Sousa
 2021-2024 – Maria Tânia Ribeiro Sousa

References

Municipalities in Bahia